Flight 512 may refer to:

Transocean Air Lines Flight 512, crashed on 12 July 1953
Eastern Air Lines Flight 512, crashed on 30 November 1962
Air Lanka Flight 512, exploded on 3 May 1986

0512